

The Croses BEC-7 is a 1960s French three-seat homebuilt aircraft designed by Emilien Croses.

Development
The BEC-7 is a tandem-wing design of all-wood construction with canvas coating.

Specifications (BEC-7 Tous Terrains)

References

1960s French civil utility aircraft
Homebuilt aircraft
Tous Terrains
Single-engined tractor aircraft
Tandem-wing aircraft
Aircraft first flown in 1967